Munir Riaz (born 25 August 2001) is a Pakistani cricketer. He made his first-class debut on 26 November 2020, for Northern, in the 2020–21 Quaid-e-Azam Trophy. taking a five-wicket haul. Prior to his first-class debut, he was part of Pakistan's squad for the 2018 Under-19 Cricket World Cup.

References

External links
 

2001 births
Living people
Pakistani cricketers
Place of birth missing (living people)